The Ritzville Carnegie Library, located in Ritzville, Washington, is a building listed on the National Register of Historic Places. It was built in 1907 with a grant from Andrew Carnegie and still operates as Ritzville's library. It was designed by the Spokane architectural firm of Preusse & Zittel. 

Daniel Buchanan created a library in 1902 when he donated 268 books to the town, and a small library was created above a store. In 1903, the town allocated $1000 toward the maintenance of the library. By 1906, the citizens of Ritzville had convinced Carnegie to help, and he pledged $10,000 toward a permanent library if the town secured and maintained a location for it. At that time, Ritzville was the smallest town in the United States to receive financial assistance from Carnegie for a library. Its basement was used for town council meetings.

See also
 National Register of Historic Places listings in Adams County, Washington

References

External links
 

1907 establishments in Washington (state)
Individually listed contributing properties to historic districts on the National Register in Washington (state)
Libraries in Washington (state)
Libraries on the National Register of Historic Places in Washington (state)
Library buildings completed in 1907
National Register of Historic Places in Adams County, Washington